The Gamekeeper can refer to:

 The Gamekeeper (film), a 1980 British film directed by Ken Loach
 "The Gamekeeper", an episode of Stargate SG-1